Sanjay Ghemawat (born 1966 in West Lafayette, Indiana) is an Indian American computer scientist and software engineer. He is currently a Senior Fellow at Google in the Systems Infrastructure Group. Ghemawat's work at Google, much of it in close collaboration with Jeff Dean, has included big data processing model MapReduce, the Google File System, and databases Bigtable and Spanner. Wired have described him as one of the "most important software engineers of the internet age".

Ghemawat was elected as a member into the National Academy of Engineering in 2009 for contributions to the science and engineering of large-scale distributed computer systems.

Education and early career 
Ghemawat studied at Cornell University and the Massachusetts Institute of Technology (MIT). He obtained a PhD from MIT in 1995, with a dissertation titled, The Modified Object Buffer: A Storage Management Technique for Object-Oriented Databases. His advisors were Barbara Liskov and Frans Kaashoek.

Before joining Google, Ghemawat worked at the DEC Systems Research Center. There he began his long-time collaboration with Jeff Dean, who worked at another DEC research lab nearby. Their work at DEC included a Java compiler and a system profiling tool.

Career at Google 
After DEC was acquired by Compaq, many of its researchers left the company. Dean took a position at the newly founded search engine company Google, and was joined by Ghemawat in 1999. The two began working on Google's core infrastructure, making improvements to cope with the search engine's rapid growth in users in the early 2000s.

Ghemawat's work at Google includes:

 MapReduce, a system for large-scale data processing applications.
 Google File System, is a proprietary distributed file system developed to provide efficient, reliable access to data using large clusters of commodity hardware. 
 Spanner, a scalable, multi-version, globally distributed, and synchronously replicated database
 Bigtable, a large-scale semi-structured storage system.
 TensorFlow, an open-source machine-learning software library.

Awards and honors 
Ghemawat was elected to the National Academy of Engineering in 2009, and to the American Academy of Arts and Sciences in 2016. In 2012, he and Dean received the ACM Prize in Computing for their work on internet infrastructure, and the ACM SIGOPS Mark Weiser Award.

Selected publications

References 

1966 births
Living people
American people of Indian descent
American computer scientists
American software engineers
Digital Equipment Corporation people
Google employees
Google Fellows
Cornell University alumni
Massachusetts Institute of Technology alumni
Members of the United States National Academy of Engineering
Fellows of the American Academy of Arts and Sciences
Recipients of the ACM Prize in Computing